Amana German ( or ) is a dialect of West Central German that is still spoken by several hundred people in the Amana Colonies in Iowa.

The Amana Colonies were founded in 1856 by Inspirationalists of German origin who came from West Seneca near Buffalo in New York. Amana is derived from the Hessian dialect, which is a West Central German dialect. There are seven villages in Amana with slightly different dialect features.

Even though the use of the language is in decline, it is far from being moribund. There are several major studies about the language of Amana.

References

Literature
 Philip E. Webber: Kolonie-Deutsch: Life and Language in Amana. Ames, 2006.
 Michael  T.  Putnam: Anaphors  in  contact:  The  distribution  of intensifiers  and  reflexives in Amana German in "Studies on German-language islands". Amsterdam et al., 2011.
 Lawrence L. Rettig: Grammatical structures in Amana German. Dissertation at the University  of Iowa, 1970.
 Joan Liffring-Zug: Life in Amana: reporters' views of the communal way, 1867 - 1935. Iowa City, 1998.

See also 
 German language in the United States
 Languages of Iowa
 Amana Colonies
 Community of True Inspiration
 Pennsylvania German
 Texas German
 Wisconsin German

Central German languages
German dialects
Endangered diaspora languages
Endangered Germanic languages
German language in the United States
German-American history
High German languages